The British Western Pacific Territories (BWPT) was the name of a colonial entity, created in 1877, for the administration, under a single representative of the British Crown, styled High Commissioner for the Western Pacific, of a series of Pacific islands in and around Oceania. Except for Fiji and the Solomon Islands, most of these colonial possessions were relatively minor.

History 
The Pacific Islanders Protection Act 1875 (38 & 39 Vic c51), then later, the Foreign Jurisdiction Act 1890 (53 & 54 Vic c.37), provided for jurisdiction over British subjects in the Pacific. In 1877 the position of Western Pacific High Commissioner was formalised by the Western Pacific Order in Council 1877 by the Privy Council of the United Kingdom. Article 12 established the Chief Justice of Fiji as the Judicial Commissioner for the Western Pacific. The Order in Council created the colonial entity – the British Western Pacific Territories – and granted the authority to manage the engagement of indentured labourers and to otherwise give the colonial entity authority over British subjects in the Western Pacific beyond the jurisdiction of British and colonial Australian laws.

The Governor of Fiji was given authority over persons and acts in the islands south of the equator. The Governor, as High Commissioner and Consul-General, was given the authority: to conduct diplomatic relations with local representatives of the foreign powers, to regulate the labour trade where  it was conducted by British subjects only, and to maintain law and order among British subjects in the Pacific islands where there were no recognised governments. The High Commissioner appointed resident commissioners to manage specific island territories. Following a commission of inquiry, a revised Order in Council was issued in 1893, which gave the resident commissioners wider autonomy over the islands under their control.

The composition of the territories of the BWPT varied over time. As the islands were spread over the South Pacific, administration of the territories was problematic. The most durable members were Fiji (from 1877 to 1952) and the Solomon Islands (from 1893 to 1976). Between 1942 and 1945, the high commission was suspended. While most islands were under British military administration, the Solomon Islands and Gilbert Islands came under Japanese occupation.

In 1952, Fiji was separated from the High Commission.  Following this, the High Commissioner's post moved to Honiara in the Solomon Islands, and the High Commissioner was also the Governor of the Solomon Islands. The High Commissioner's Court, however, continued to meet in Suva, with the Chief Justice of Fiji continuing as Chief Judicial Commissioner for another decade, until 1962, when the two offices were separated. Under the Western Pacific (Courts) Order in Council, gazetted on 15 August 1961 and effective from 9 April 1962, the High Commissioner's Court was renamed the High Court of the Western Pacific and relocated to the Solomon Islands. The court consisted of a Chief Justice (as the office of Chief Judicial Commissioner was renamed) and two puisne judges, one based in Port Vila, New Hebrides (now Vanuatu), and the other in Tarawa, Gilbert and Ellice Islands (now Kiribati and Tuvalu).

Most of the island groups had gained either independence or internal self-government by 1971. On 1 January 1972, the Gilbert and Ellice Islands were taken off with their own governor. On 2 January 1976 after nearly all had been given separate statehood, the office of High Commissioner and the entity of the Pacific Territories were abolished. A remnant of the High Commission, however, was the right of appeal from the courts of many island nations to the Fijian Court of Appeal, which persisted into the late 1970s. With the independence of Kiribati in 1979, all islands formerly a part of the territories (except the Pitcairn Islands) had either gained independence or been attached to other entities.

In 2002 the archived records of this High Commission were transferred to New Zealand, and are now held in the Special Collections of the University of Auckland Library.

Island groups 

  (1892 to 1971) – now independent separately, as Kiribati (in Micronesia) and Tuvalu (in Polynesia) respectively

In Polynesia
  Canton and Enderbury Islands (1939 to 1971) – now a part of Kiribati
  Cook Islands (1893 to 1901) – 15 small islands, now a self-governing parliamentary democracy in free association with New Zealand
  Savage Island, also known as "Rock of Polynesia" (1900 to 1901) – now Niue; presently a self-governing state in free association with New Zealand
 Phoenix Islands (to 1939) – eight nearly uninhabited atolls, presently part of Kiribati
  Pitcairn Islands (1898 to 1952) – a current British overseas territory
  Tonga (1900 to 1952) – a native kingdom and protected state, independent since 1970
  Union Islands (1877 to 1926, officially to 1948) – now Tokelau, a dependent territory of New Zealand

In Micronesia
  Nauru (Pleasant Island) 1914 to 1921 (After World War I, Nauru became a League of Nations Mandate territory, administered by Australia; in 1947, a corresponding UN Trusteeship was approved by the United Nations; it achieved independence in 1968

In Melanesia
  Fiji (1877 to 1970) – now independent
  British Solomon Islands (1893 to 1971) – now independent as the Solomon Islands
  (1906 to 1971), a Franco-British condominium – now independent as Vanuatu

See also 
 British Borneo
 North Borneo
 High Commissioner for the Western Pacific, with incumbents list

Sources, references and external links

 WorldStatesmen
 Deryck Scarr, Fragments of Empire. A History of the Western Pacific High Commission. 1877–1914, Canberra: Australian National University Press & London: C. Hurst & Co., 1967.

 
Western Pacific Territories
History of Melanesia
History of Polynesia
History of Fiji
History of Kiribati
History of Nauru
History of Niue
History of the Solomon Islands
History of Tonga
History of Tuvalu
History of Vanuatu
Kiribati–United Kingdom relations
Cook Islands–United Kingdom relations
Fiji–United Kingdom relations
Nauru–United Kingdom relations
United Kingdom–Vanuatu relations
Niue–United Kingdom relations
Solomon Islands–United Kingdom relations
Tonga–United Kingdom relations
Tuvalu–United Kingdom relations
New Zealand–United Kingdom relations
1877 establishments in the British Empire
1976 disestablishments in the British Empire
1877 establishments in Oceania
1976 disestablishments in Oceania
States and territories disestablished in 1976
States and territories established in 1877